Ryder is an American transportation company.

Ryder may also refer to:

 Ryder (name)
 Ryder (band), British male pop group
 Honey Ryder (music), British songwriting duo
 Ryder (novel), a 1928 novel by Djuna Barnes

Places
 Ryder (crater), a lunar crater
 Ryder, Missouri, USA
 Ryder, North Dakota, USA
 Ryder Bay Islands Important Bird Area, Antarctica

See also 
 Ryder Cup, a biennial golf tournament
 Rider (disambiguation)
 Ryder Report (disambiguation)
 Red Ryder (disambiguation)